Andrew Jesse McDonald (September 5, 1898 – August 21, 1988) was an American football and basketball player and coach. He served as the head football coach (1934–1937) and head basketball coach (1925–1950) at Southwest Missouri State Normal School—now known as Missouri State University—in Springfield, Missouri.

McDonald was a two-sport athlete at the University of Kansas, starting at quarterback in football and playing basketball under head coach Phog Allen.

Head coaching record

Basketball

Football

References

External links
 

1898 births
1988 deaths
American football ends
American football quarterbacks
Basketball coaches from Kansas
Kansas Jayhawks football players
Kansas Jayhawks men's basketball players
Missouri State Bears football coaches
Missouri State Bears basketball coaches
College golf coaches in the United States
People from McLouth, Kansas
Players of American football from Kansas
Basketball players from Kansas